Strigoderma arbicola, known generally as sand chafer, is a species of shining leaf chafer in the family of beetles known as Scarabaeidae. Other common names include the spring rose beetle, false Japanese beetle, and rose chafer.

References

Further reading

 

Rutelinae
Articles created by Qbugbot
Beetles described in 1793